Raidi (also written Ragdi; born August, 1938) is a Tibetan politician of the People's Republic of China. He served as a vice chairman of the Standing Committee of the National People's Congress from 2003 to 2008, and the highest ranking Tibetan in China.

Biography
He is a native of Biru County, Tibet Autonomous Region. He is a graduate of the Central Party School of the Chinese Communist Party, and joined the Chinese Communist Party in October 1961.

Tibetan Review wrote on September 3, 2019, that "China has included Re Di (also written as Raidi or Redi, but pronounced as Ragdi), one of top Tibetan collaborators with its occupation rule in Tibet, in a list of 36 nominees for its highest state honor which was announced on Aug 27."

References

External links 
 Raidi biography @ China Vitae, the web's largest online database of China VIPs

1938 births
Living people
People's Republic of China politicians from Tibet
Tibetan politicians
People from Nagqu
Central Party School of the Chinese Communist Party alumni
Chinese Communist Party politicians from Tibet
Political office-holders in Tibet
Alternate members of the 11th Central Committee of the Chinese Communist Party
Vice Chairpersons of the National People's Congress
Members of the Standing Committee of the 10th National People's Congress
Delegates to the 9th National People's Congress
Delegates to the 8th National People's Congress